The mottled petrel (Pterodroma inexpectata) or kōrure is a species of seabird and a member of the gadfly petrels. It usually attains  in length with a  wingspan.

This species is highly pelagic, rarely approaching land, except to nest and rear young.  The mottled petrel feeds mostly on fish and squid, with some crustaceans taken.  It is a transequatorial migrant, breeding in the islands of New Zealand, and migrating to the Bering Sea, concentrating in the Gulf of Alaska and the Aleutian Islands.

The mottled petrel uses burrows and rock crevices to nest in. It was formerly more numerous than today.  The species' numbers have been and continue to be affected by predation by introduced mammals. Chicks have been reintroduced to Maungaharuru, hills 24 km from the sea, in Hawke's Bay.

References

 "National Geographic"  Field Guide to the Birds of North America 
 Seabirds, an Identification Guide by Peter Harrison, (1983) 
Handbook of the Birds of the World Vol 1,  Josep del Hoyo editor, 
"National Audubon Society" The Sibley Guide to Birds, by David Allen Sibley,

External links

Mottled petrel profile - Birdweb.org
Mottled Petrel, New Zealand Birds Online

mottled petrel
Birds of the South Island
mottled petrel
mottled petrel